Trigga may refer to:

People
Trey Songz, American R&B artiste popularly known as Trigga
Trigga tha Gambler, also Trigga, New York rapper
Trigga, part of crew of Miami-based rapper JT Money
Trigga, Nigerian rapper on "Koma Roll Remix", Tillaman featuring Iyanya and others
Lae D-Trigga, rapper on "Never Ending Saga" from Guru album Baldhead Slick & da Click
Trigga, British MC on Wiley album Race Against Time

Other uses
Trigga (album), Trey Songz 2014 album

See also

 
 Trigger (disambiguation)
 Triga (disambiguation)